Amnon Shamosh (28 January 1929 – 1 March 2022) was an Israeli author and poet.

Biography
Shamosh was born in Aleppo, Syria, France. In his childhood he immigrated to Mandatory Palestine and participated in the 1948 Arab–Israeli War in a Palmach unit. He studied at the Hebrew University of Jerusalem. He was a founder of kibbutz Ma'ayan Baruch.

Shamosh died in Ma'ayan Baruch on 1 March 2022, at the age of 93.

Selected works
Michel Ezra Safra and Sons
 My Sister the Bride (published 1979 in English by Massada Press)
 The Great Confession
 The Cedars of Lebanon
 With Me from Lebanon
 Marrano Mountain (published 1992 in English by Massada Press)
 Calamus and Cinnamon
 A Kibbutz is a Kibbutz is a Kibbutz
 From the Source
 Autumn Stories, Fall Colors
 On the Silk Road (2000)

Shamosh also wrote the non-fiction book Haketer, the Story of the Aleppo Codex.

Awards and recognition
Shamosh was awarded the President's Prize for Literature in 2001. He also received many other awards for his writing.

See also
Hebrew literature

References

1929 births
2022 deaths
Israeli Sephardi Jews
Syrian Jews
Palmach members
Israeli non-fiction writers
Israeli novelists
Hebrew-language writers
Hebrew-language poets
Israeli people of Syrian-Jewish descent
Jews in the French Mandate for Syria and the Lebanon
Recipients of Prime Minister's Prize for Hebrew Literary Works
Sephardi Jews in Mandatory Palestine
Herzliya Hebrew Gymnasium alumni
Hebrew University of Jerusalem alumni
People from Aleppo